Ister Chaos is a broken up area in the Lunae Palus quadrangle of Mars.  It is located at 13.0° N and 56.4° W.  It is 103.4 km across and was named after a classical albedo feature at 10N, 56W.

See also 
 Chaos terrain
 Geology of Mars
 HiRISE
 List of areas of chaos terrain on Mars
 Martian chaos terrain

References

External links 

Lunae Palus quadrangle
Chaotic terrains on Mars